The Lake Village Post Office is a historic post office building at 206 South Cokley Street in Lake Village, Arkansas.  The single story brick Colonial Revival building was built c. 1939; it is roughly square in shape, with a four sided cupola topped by a bell-cast roof and pyramid.  The interior features a mural drawn by Avery Johnson and installed in 1941; it was financed by the Treasury Department's Section of Fine Arts, and depicts cypress trees and deer.

The building was listed on the National Register of Historic Places in 1998.

See also 

National Register of Historic Places listings in Chicot County, Arkansas
List of United States post offices

References 

Post office buildings on the National Register of Historic Places in Arkansas
Colonial Revival architecture in Arkansas
Government buildings completed in 1938
National Register of Historic Places in Chicot County, Arkansas
Lake Village, Arkansas
1938 establishments in Arkansas